Bettendorf is a commune and town in eastern Luxembourg. It lies along the river Sauer. It is part of the canton of Diekirch, which is part of the district of Diekirch.

, the town of Bettendorf itself, which lies in the centre of the commune, has a population of 1,045.  Other towns within the commune include Bleesbruck, Gilsdorf and Moestroff.

The privately owned Bettendorf Castle dates from 1728 and is built in the Baroque style.

Population

References

External links
 

 
Communes in Diekirch (canton)
Towns in Luxembourg